The White Rose Mission (also known as the White Rose Home for Colored Working Girls and the White Rose Industrial Association) was created on February 11, 1897 as a  "Christian, nonsectarian Home for Colored Girls and Women" by African American civic leaders, Victoria Earle Matthews (1861–1907) and Maritcha Remond Lyons (1848–1929). The settlement house, located on Manhattan's Upper West side in the neighborhood known then as San Juan Hill, was founded to offer refuge, shelter and food for newly arrived African American /Colored women from the southern United States and the West Indies. Aware of the perilous conditions for young African American women seeking work in New York City, Matthews and Lyons and other volunteers working with The White Rose Mission met incoming vessels. At Manhattan’s piers, docks and railway stations, volunteers offered assistance to female travelers who often fell prey to unscrupulous employment agents and con artists. As traveler’s assistance services were generally not available to African American women, the White Rose Mission, under the direction of Victoria Earle Matthews, was founded to address the specific problems facing African American female migrants.

Formerly enslaved, Victoria Earle Matthews was a prominent social reformer. She conducted detailed research into the working conditions of young African American women often by passing as a white person to obtain information on schemes and organized rings. Matthews observed that for "the young and unfriended (women) of other races, there are all sorts of institutions," but for black girls and women "there is nothing." Matthews organized a dedicated group who shared her commitment, including educator and activist, Maritcha Remond Lyons and poet and activist, Alice Moore Dunbar Nelson. African American migrants coming to New York City in the post-Civil War/Reconstruction era faced limited employment opportunities, inadequate housing, grinding poverty, racial prejudice and racially motivated violence.
Founded to offer shelter and food to destitute migrants, The White Rose Mission also offered job placement for the new arrivals. As African American workers were relegated to jobs as unskilled laborers, conditions and opportunities for African American female workers in New York City were deplorable. The aim of the employment placement service of the White Rose Mission was to furnish skilled, circumspect domestic workers to middle-class homes. The Mission also offered instruction in aspects of housekeeping, such as: cooking, sewing, expert waiting and laundering. Additionally The Mission provided a clean parlor where women who were dues-paying members could entertain callers.

The White Rose Mission evolved to provide social services unavailable to African Americans in New York City such as enrichment classes, child-rearing instructions and a Penny Provident Bank thrift program. The White Rose Mission also maintained a library of works relevant to the history and accomplishments of African and African American people. Considered one of the most unusual and important early collections of special materials about Black people, the White Rose Mission's library included a 1773 edition of the poems of Phillis Wheatley, an 1859 volume of the Anglo-African Magazine and a first edition of An Appeal in Favor of that Class of Americans Called Africans by Lydia Maria Child. Lectures were regularly held at the Mission and in 1908 "New Negro Movement" founder, Hubert Harrison, a writer, orator, educator, critic and political activist, offered race history classes. Hubert Harrison also helped to organize a literary club at the White Rose Home, delivered lectures on post-war Reconstruction and took charge of the Home’s Boys Club. After Matthews' death, Frances Reynolds Keyser was director of the White Rose, from 1907 to 1912.

When it first opened in 1897, The White Rose Mission was located at 217 East 86th Street. In 1918, The Mission moved to 262 West 136th Street from where it operated until it ceased operation in 1984.

References

External links 
 

African-American history in New York City
Lincoln Square, Manhattan
History of women in New York City